The 1976 UEFA European Under-23 Championship, which spanned two years (1974–76) had 23 entrants. Soviet Union U-23 won the competition.

The 23 national teams were divided into eight groups (seven groups of 3 + one group of 2).   The group winners played off against each other on a two-legged home-and-away basis until the winner was decided.  There was no finals tournament or 3rd-place playoff.

Qualifying stage

Draw
The allocation of teams into qualifying groups was based on that of UEFA Euro 1976 qualifying tournament with several changes, reflecting the absence of some nations:
 Group 1 did not include Cyprus
 Group 2 did not include Wales
 Group 3 did not include Northern Ireland
 Group 4 did not include Spain
 Group 5 did not include Poland (moved to Group 8)
 Group 6 did not include Republic of Ireland and Switzerland
 Group 7 did not include Iceland
 Group 8 did not include West Germany and Malta, but included Poland (moved from Group 5)

Knockout stages

See also 
 UEFA European Under-21 Championship

External links 
 Results Archive at uefa.com
 RSSSF Results Archive ''at rsssf.com

UEFA European Under-21 Championship
UEFA
UEFA
1976 in youth association football